Vanadzor, is a river in Lori Province, Northern Armenia.

References

Rivers of Armenia